The 2009 Asian Baseball Cup was hosted in Bangkok, Thailand after being scheduled to be held in the Philippines. The tournament was won by Indonesia in the final against Pakistan. Indonesia will continue to the 2009 Asian Baseball Championship.

Teams

Group A

Group B

Preliminary round

May 25

May 26

May 27

Semi-finals

Finals

References

Asian Baseball Cup
Asian Baseball Cup